Lee Ju-yeol (born 24 July 1952) is a South Korean economist and technocrat served as the 25th Governor of the Bank of Korea, the South Korean central bank, from 2014 to 2022. He was re-nominated for the governorship by President Moon Jae-in and the nomination was confirmed by the National Assembly, thus renewing his governorship to March 2022 and becoming the first central bank Governor to be appointed for a second term throughout the history of the nation. He also serves as the Alternate Governor representing South Korea on the IMF Board.

Lee received his BA in Business Management from Yonsei University in 1977 and MA in Economics from Pennsylvania State University in 1988. He first worked at the Bank of Korea in 1977 and served as Senior Deputy Governor from 2009 to 2012. Afterwards, he retired to work as an Economics professor at Yonsei University.

Lee is married and has a son and a daughter.

References 

1952 births
Living people
Governors of the Bank of Korea
South Korean economists
Yonsei University alumni
Pennsylvania State University alumni